Novaya Tavolzhanka is a rural locality (a selo) and the administrative center of Novotavolzhanskoye Rural Settlement, Shebekinsky District, Belgorod Oblast, Russia. Population:  There are 67 streets.

Geography 
Novaya Tavolzhanka is located 10 km northeast of Shebekino (the district's administrative centre) by road. Arkhangelskoye is the nearest rural locality.

References 

Rural localities in Shebekinsky District